Patricia Sharyn Moffett (September 12, 1936 – December 23, 2021) was an American child actress who appeared in films during the 1940s.

Life and career
Moffett was born in Alameda, California on September 12, 1936, to a show business family. Her parents were singer R.E. Moffett and dancer Gladyce Lloyd Roberts.  Her younger brother, Gregory Moffett, was also a child actor. 

At the age of 11 months, Moffett appeared in In Old Chicago for 20th Century Fox. When she was four, her parents moved to Beverly Hills, California to explore her potential as a movie actress. 

By age five, she had appeared in the 1942 Three Stooges short film Even as IOU as a daughter whose family was dispossessed. At age 7, she had her feature screen debut playing the lead in the film My Pal Wolf (1944). In 1944, she signed a seven-year contract with RKO Pictures. 

Overall, she appeared in a dozen films, including The Body Snatcher (1945), the film noir The Locket (1946), Child of Divorce (1946), Banjo (1947), and Mr. Blandings Builds His Dream House (1948). In later years, she made occasional appearances at conventions and film festivals.  

In 1955, Moffett married minister James Forrest and ministered with him in churches for more than 50 years. They had three children. He died in 2011. She died in Pittsburgh, Pennsylvania on December 23, 2021, at the age of 85.

Filmography

References

Further reading 
 Best, Marc. Those Endearing Young Charms: Child Performers of the Screen (South Brunswick and New York: Barnes & Co., 1971), pp. 192–196.

External links
 
 Sharyn Moffett at the American Film Institute

1936 births
2021 deaths
20th-century American actresses
21st-century American women
American child actresses
American film actresses
People from Alameda, California
RKO Pictures contract players